The 2005 Spanish Formula Three Championship was the fifth Spanish Formula Three season. It began on 17 April at Circuito del Jarama in Madrid and ended on 13 November at Circuit de Catalunya in Montmeló after fifteen races. Andy Soucek was crowned series champion.

Teams and drivers
 All teams were Spanish-registered. All cars were powered by Toyota engines and Dunlop tyres. Main class powered by Dallara F305, while Copa Class by Dallara F300 chassis.